Partulidae is a family of air-breathing land snails, terrestrial gastropod mollusks in the superfamily Pupilloidea.

The family is endemic to Pacific islands.

Genera 
The Partulidae are divided into five genera:

 Eua has four species, confined to Tonga and Samoa.
 Palaopartula Pilsbry, 1909- has three species, restricted to the Palau.
 Partula Pilsbry, 1909 - has about 100 species, distributed from New Guinea to the Society Islands. 
 Samoana Pilsbry, 1909 - has about 23 species, distributed in Polynesia and the Mariana Islands.
 Sphendone has a single species from the Palau.

This cladogram shows the phylogenic relationships of genera in the family Partulidae:

Synonyms
 Aega Hartman, 1881: synonym of Samoana (Marquesana)  Pilsbry, 1909 represented as Samoana Pilsbry, 1909
 Astraea Hartman, 1881: synonym of Partula A. Férussac, 1821
 Clytia Hartman, 1881: synonym of Partula A. Férussac, 1821
 Echo Hartman, 1881: synonym of Partula (Leptopartula) Pilsbry, 1909: synonym of Partula A. Férussac, 1821
 Evadne Hartman, 1881: synonym of Samoana Pilsbry, 1909
 Harmonia Hartman, 1881: synonym of Partula (Marianella) Pilsbry, 1909: synonym of v
 Helena Hartman, 1881: synonym ofPartula A. Férussac, 1821
 Latia Hartman, 1881: synonym of Samoana (Marquesana) Pilsbry, 1909 represented as Samoana Pilsbry, 1909 (unavailable; a junior homonym of Latia Gray, 1850 [Latiidae])
 Marianna Pilsbry, 1909: synonym of Partula (Marianella) Pilsbry, 1909: synonym of Partula A. Férussac, 1821
 Matata Hartman, 1881: synonym of Partula A. Férussac, 1821
 Nenia Hartman, 1881: synonym of Partula A. Férussac, 1821
 Oenone Hartman, 1881: synonym of Partula A. Férussac, 1821
 Pasithea Hartman, 1881: synonym of Partula A. Férussac, 1821(junior synonym)
 Rennellia Clench, 1941: synonym of Partula A. Férussac, 1821 (junior synonym)
 Scilistylus Iredale, 1941: synonym ofPartula A. Férussac, 1821
 Sterope Hartman, 1881: synonym of Partula (Melanesica) Pilsbry, 1909: synonym of Partula A. Férussac, 1821

Anatomy

In this family, the number of haploid chromosomes lies between 26 and 30 (according to the values in this table).

Significance
The Partulidae represent a significant species radiation and were important in the development of modern evolutionary studies through the work of Henry Crampton in the early 20th century and later by Bryan Clarke, James Murray and Michael Johnson.

Status
Most Partulidae species have declined since 1974 and a very large proportion are extinct. The main threat to their survival has been the introduction of the predatory snail Euglandina rosea.

References

 Gerlach J. (2016). Icons of evolution: Pacific Island tree-snails of the family Partulidae. Phelsuma Press.

External links 

 Partulidae evolution, diversity and conservation Partula Pages
 Bouchet, P. & Rocroi, J.-P. (2005). Classification and nomenclator of gastropod families. Malacologia. 47 (1-2): 1-397